Philippe Turlure is an American set decorator. He was nominated for an Academy Award in the category Best Production Design for the film Evita.

Selected filmography 
 Evita (1996; co-nominated with Brian Morris)

References

External links 

Living people
Place of birth missing (living people)
Year of birth missing (living people)
American set decorators